Oberonia disticha is a species of orchid native to tropical and southern Africa and islands in the west Indian Ocean.

References

disticha
Orchids of Madagascar
Orchids of Mauritius
Flora of West Tropical Africa
Flora of West-Central Tropical Africa
Flora of Northeast Tropical Africa
Flora of East Tropical Africa
Flora of South Tropical Africa
Flora of Southern Africa
Flora of the Western Indian Ocean